Epocilla is a genus of jumping spiders that was first described by Tamerlan Thorell in 1887.

Species
 it contains twelve species, found in Asia, Mauritius, on the Seychelles, and Hawaii:
Epocilla aurantiaca (Simon, 1885) – India to Malaysia
Epocilla blairei Zabka, 1985 – China, Vietnam
Epocilla calcarata (Karsch, 1880) – China to Indonesia (Sulawesi). Introduced to Seychelles, USA (Hawaii)
Epocilla chimakothiensis Jastrzebski, 2007 – Bhutan
Epocilla femoralis Simon, 1901 – Indonesia (Sumatra)
Epocilla innotata Thorell, 1895 – Myanmar
Epocilla mauriciana Simon, 1901 – Mauritius
Epocilla pakhtunkhwa Ali & Maddison, 2018 – Pakistan
Epocilla picturata Simon, 1901 – China
Epocilla praetextata Thorell, 1887 (type) – India, Bhutan, Myanmar to Indonesia (Java)
Epocilla sirohi Caleb, Chatterjee, Tyagi, Kundu & Kumar, 2017 – India
Epocilla xylina Simon, 1906 – India

References

External links 
  Genus description

Salticidae
Salticidae genera
Spiders of Asia
Spiders of Oceania
Taxa named by Tamerlan Thorell